Tasco is a town and municipality in the Valderrama Province, part of the Colombian department of Boyacá. The Chicamocha River flows through the municipality which borders Socha in the north, Corrales and Gámeza in the south, Socotá in the east and Betéitiva and Paz de Río in the west.

Etymology 
Tasco in the Chibcha language of the Muisca means "Enclosure or mansion of the sovereign".

History 
The area of Tasco was inhabited by the Boche and Pirgua tribes, before the Spanish conquest of the Muisca. Modern Tasco was founded on October 15, 1577. Mummies have been encountered in Tasco.

Economy 
Main economical activities of Tasco are agriculture and livestock farming. Among the agricultural products are potatoes, Ullucus tuberosus, turnips, maize, beans, barley, peas and chick peas. Fruits cultivated in Tasco are peaches, pears, prunes, apples and the Colombian fruit curuba.

Paleontology 
Fossil remains of the Rosidae Berhamniphyllum and Archaeopaliurus boyacensis have been found in the Maastrichtian Guaduas Formation in Tasco and described in 2010.

Gallery

References 

Municipalities of Boyacá Department
Populated places established in 1577
1577 establishments in the Spanish Empire
Muisca Confederation